John "Jack" Green was an English-Canadian soccer inside forward who played professionally in Canada and the American Soccer League.

In 1924, Green began his career with Montreal Carsteel.  In the fall of 1926, Green moved south to join Providence F.C. of the American Soccer League.
In May 1927, Green was back with Carsteel.  In August 1927, he was the victim of a hit-and-run accident which nearly cost him his life.  He took nearly a year to recover.  When he did, he returned to Providence F.C. for the 1928–29 American Soccer League season.  That year, he finished the season ranked fifteenth on the league’s scoring list.  In 1929, he returned to Canada where he played for Montreal CNR in the National Soccer League. That year, CNR won the Canada FA Trophy.  In 1930, Green and his teammates fell to the Westminster Royals in a three-game final.

Green may have played for Grenadier Guards during his career, but in 1937, he was still playing for Montreal CNR, now known as CNR Scottish.

External links

References

1960 deaths
Canadian soccer players
Canadian expatriate soccer players
American Soccer League (1921–1933) players
Montreal Carsteel players
Providence Clamdiggers players
Year of birth missing
Association football forwards
Canadian National Soccer League players